The Max Headroom signal hijacking occurred on the night of November 22, 1987, when the television signals of two stations in Chicago, Illinois, were hijacked, briefly sending a pirate broadcast of an unidentified person wearing a Max Headroom mask and costume to thousands of home viewers.

The first incident took place during the sports segment of independent TV station WGN-TV's 9:00 p.m. newscast. Like the later signal intrusion, it featured a person wearing a mask swaying erratically in front of a swiveling corrugated metal panel apparently meant to resemble Max Headroom's animated geometric background. Unlike the later intrusion, the only sound was a loud buzz. This interruption went on for almost 17 seconds before engineers at WGN were able to regain control of their broadcast tower.

The second incident occurred about two hours later during PBS member station WTTW's broadcast of the Doctor Who serial Horror of Fang Rock. This signal takeover was more sustained, and the masked figure could be heard making reference to the real Max Headroom's advertisements for New Coke, the animated TV series Clutch Cargo, WGN sportscaster Chuck Swirsky, "Greatest World Newspaper nerds", and other seemingly unrelated topics. The video concluded with the masked figure’s bare buttocks being spanked by a woman with a flyswatter while yelling "They're coming to get me!", with the woman responding "Bend over, bitch!" as the figure was crying and screaming. At that point, the pirate transmission ended and normal programming resumed after a total interruption of about 90 seconds.

A criminal investigation conducted by the Federal Communications Commission in the immediate aftermath of the intrusion could not find the persons responsible, and despite many unofficial inquiries and much speculation over the ensuing decades, the culprits have yet to be positively identified.

Signal intrusion
Both Max Headroom broadcast signal intrusion incidents took place on local Chicago television stations on the night of Sunday, November 22, 1987.

WGN-TV

The first intrusion took place at 9:14pm during the sports segment of WGN-TV's The Nine O'Clock News. Home viewers' screens went black for about fifteen seconds, before footage of a person wearing a Max Headroom mask and sunglasses is displayed. The individual rocks erratically in front of a rotating corrugated metal panel that mimicked the real Max Headroom's geometric background effect accompanied by a staticky and garbled buzzing sound. The entire intrusion lasted for about 20 seconds and was cut off when engineers at WGN changed the frequency of the signal linking the broadcast studio to the station's transmitter atop the John Hancock Center.

Upon returning to the airwaves, WGN sports anchor Dan Roan commented, "Well, if you're wondering what's happened, so am I", and joked that the computer running the news "took off and went wild". Roan then proceeded to restart his report of the day's Chicago Bears game, which had been interrupted by the intrusion.

WTTW

That same night, at about 11:20 pm, the signal of local PBS station WTTW was interrupted during an airing of the Doctor Who serial Horror of Fang Rock. The culprit was the same Max Headroom impersonator, this time speaking with distorted audio.

The masked figure made a comment about "nerds", called WGN sportscaster Chuck Swirsky a "frickin' liberal", held up a can of Pepsi while saying "Catch the wave" (a slogan from an ad campaign for Coca-Cola featuring the Max Headroom character), and held up a middle finger inside what appeared to be a hollowed-out dildo. The figure then ran through a series of quick comments and song snippets interspersed with excited noises and exclamations. "Max" sang the phrase "Your love is fading"; hummed part of the theme song to the 1959 animated series Clutch Cargo and said, "I still see the X!" (This was a reference to the last episode of that show, which is sometimes misheard as "I stole CBS."). He also feigned defecation (complaining of his piles) and explained that he had "made a giant masterpiece for all the Greatest World Newspaper nerds" (WGN's call letters stand for "World's Greatest Newspaper"), and discussed sharing a pair of dirty gloves with his brother. After a crude video edit, the person had moved mostly offscreen to the left with his partially exposed buttocks visible from the side, with a female figure wearing a French maid costume and what appears to be a mask appearing on the right edge of the frame. The (unworn) Max Headroom mask was briefly held in view while the voice cried out, "Oh no, they're coming to get me! Ah, make it stop!" and the female figure began spanking "Max" with a flyswatter. The image faded briefly into static, and then viewers were returned to the Doctor Who broadcast after a total interruption of about 90 seconds.

Technicians at WTTW's studios could not counteract the signal takeover because there were no engineers on duty at that hour at the Sears Tower, where the station's broadcast tower was located. According to station spokesman Anders Yocom, technicians monitoring the transmission from WTTW headquarters "attempted to take corrective measures, but couldn't." Air director Paul Rizzo recalled that "as the content got weirder we got increasingly stressed out about our inability to do anything about it." The pirate broadcast ended when the hijackers unilaterally ended their transmission. "By the time our people began looking into what was going on, it was over," said Yocom. WTTW received numerous phone calls from viewers who wondered what had occurred.

Methods and investigations
The broadcast intrusion was achieved by sending a more powerful microwave transmission to the stations' broadcast towers than the stations were sending themselves, which was a difficult task in 1987 but was possible before American television stations switched from analog to digital signals in 2009. Experts have said that the stunt required extensive technical expertise and a significant amount of transmitting power, and that the pirate broadcast likely originated from somewhere in the line of sight of both stations' broadcast towers, which were atop two tall buildings in downtown Chicago.

No one has ever claimed responsibility for the stunt. Speculation about the identities of "Max" and his co-conspirators has centered on the theories that the prank was either an inside job by a disgruntled employee (or former employee) of WGN or was carried out by members of Chicago's underground hacker community. However, despite an official law enforcement investigation in the immediate aftermath of the incident and many unofficial investigations, inquiries, and online speculation in the ensuing decades, the identities and motives of the hijackers remain a mystery.
 
An FCC official quoted in reporting soon after the intrusion said that the perpetrators faced a maximum fine of $100,000 and up to a year in prison. However, the five-year statute of limitations was surpassed in 1992, so the persons responsible for the intrusion would no longer face criminal punishment should their identities be revealed.

Cultural impact
Not long after the incident, WMAQ-TV humorously inserted clips of the hijacking into a newscast during Mark Giangreco's sports highlights. "A lot of people thought it was real – the pirate cutting into our broadcast. We got all kinds of calls about it," said Giangreco.

According to Motherboard, the incident became an influential "cyberpunk hacking trope".

See also
 Captain Midnight broadcast signal intrusion
 Pirate television
 Southern Television broadcast interruption

References

Further reading

External links

 
 
 
 

1987 crimes in the United States
1987 in American television
1980s in Chicago
1987 in Illinois
Black comedy
Max Headroom
November 1987 events in the United States
Pirate television
Surreal comedy
Television controversies in the United States
Unidentified American criminals
Unsolved crimes in the United States